Ballardsville is an unincorporated community in Oldham County, Kentucky, United States. It is a small unincorporated community that lies a few miles south of La Grange on KY 53.

The community bears the name of a local family.

References

External links
"Ballardsville: Lofty Position Is Befitting for Baptist Church that Has Been Reference Point in City History" — Article by Kim Chappell of The Courier-Journal

Unincorporated communities in Oldham County, Kentucky
Unincorporated communities in Kentucky
Louisville metropolitan area